Chotika Wongwilas (born July 15, 1984), nickname Noey (Noei), is an actress and model under contract with Thailand's Channel 3 Television broadcaster for whom she has acted in several lakorn (Thai television soap operas).  Known primarily for her "villainous roles", she first appeared in the 2007 drama Invisible Friend (เพื่อนซี้ล่องหน).  Other notable performances include her work in Neung Nai Suang (Only you in my heart) in 2015, Cubic in 2014, and Game Rai Game Rak (Evil Game/Love Game) in 2011.

Chotika grew up in Phatthalung Province in southern Thailand where she attended the Satri Phatthalung School.  She obtained her B.A. in IT Business Management at Prince of Songkla University and then went on to earn a Master's degree in Recreation and Tourism Management at Chulalongkorn University.

Filmography

Dramas 
 Plerng Prai (Ch.3 2009)
 Hua Jai Song Park 2009 (Ch.3 2009/2010)
 Tat Dao Bussaya (2009) (Ch.3 2010)
 Suay Rerd Cherd Sode (Ch.3 2010)
 Tard Rak (Ch.3 2011)
 Pla Lhai Paai Daeng (Ch.3 2011)
 Plerng Torranong (Ch.3 2011)
 Kol Ruk Luang Jai (Ch.3 2011)
 Game Rai Phaai Game Ruk (Ch.3 2011) with Pidsanu Nimsakul
 Mam Gaem Daeng (Ch.3 2012)
 Waew Mayura (CH3/2012)
 Office Pichit Jai (Ch.9/2013)
 Suparburoot Jutathep (CH. 2013)
 Ai Koon Pee (CH.3 2013)
 Look Tard (Ch.3 2014)
 Cubic (Ch.3 2014)
 Yah Leum Chan (2014) (Ch.3 2014)
 Ruk Ok Rit (Ch.3 2014)
 Neung Nai Suang (Ch.3 2015)
 Bu Ram Pram Pra (Ch.3 2015)
 Plub Plerng See Chompoo with Tah Warit Tipgomut (Ch.3 2015)
 Than Chay Kammalor (CH.3 2016)
 Payak Rai Ruk Puan (Ch.3 2016)
 Kularb Tud Petch (Ch.3 2016)
 Kleun Cheewit (Ch.3 2017)
 Bunlang Dok Mai with Mawin Taweepol (Ch.3 2017)

References

External links 
 

1984 births
Chotika Wongwilas
Living people
Chotika Wongwilas
Chotika Wongwilas
Chotika Wongwilas
Chotika Wongwilas
Chotika Wongwilas